Edgewood is a town in Santa Fe County, New Mexico, United States. Through annexations, its town boundaries now extend into Bernalillo and Sandoval counties. It is part of the Albuquerque–Santa Fe–Las Vegas combined statistical area.

Although in Santa Fe County, Edgewood is geographically closer to Albuquerque than to the city of Santa Fe. The town's population grew 97% between 2000 and 2010, from 1,893 to 3,735. Edgewood boasts a median household income of over $50,000 per year, a high number compared to the state averages.

History 
Homesteaders moving into the American West created the initial settlements that grew into what is now the town of Edgewood. Taking advantage of the federal Homestead Acts, pioneer families obtained land claims and began farming and ranching in the Edgewood area during the late 19th and early 20th centuries.

Edgewood was founded by a group of southern Santa Fe County residents and landowners. After the incorporation of the town in 1999, large areas of land were annexed. Efforts by the town government to avoid annexing properties whose owners did not wish to be brought within the town boundaries resulted in a checkerboard pattern of incorporated and unincorporated properties, one of the issues to be resolved in the town's Comprehensive Plan. One controversial annexation greatly enlarged the municipal boundaries and was the source of vigorous public debate. Despite two appeals and one lawsuit, the annexation was upheld.
Recent construction projects have brought in a Tractor Supply Co. store, an O'Reilly Auto Parts, a Denny's, and a Comfort Inn & Suites, the town's first hotel.

Geography 

It is located within the Estancia Valley, east of the Sandia Mountains and Manzano Mountains of central New Mexico. Most of the land cover in the area is woodland or grassland. The town's commercial district lies along New Mexico Highway 66 (part of the post-1937 U.S. Route 66) and Highway 344.

Demographics 

As of the census of 2000, there were 1,893 people, 676 households, and 529 families residing in the town. The population density was 217.2 people per square mile (83.9/km2). There were 755 housing units at an average density of 86.6 per square mile (33.5/km2). The racial makeup of the town was 86.53% White, 0.32% African American, 2.17% Native American, 0.21% Asian, 0.16% Pacific Islander, 8.24% from other races, and 2.38% from two or more races. Hispanic or Latino of any race were 20.34% of the population.

There were 676 households, out of which 44.1% had children under the age of 18 living with them, 63.9% were married couples living together, 10.1% had a female householder with no husband present, and 21.6% were non-families. 18.0% of all households were made up of individuals, and 4.4% had someone living alone who was 65 years of age or older. The average household size was 2.80 and the average family size was 3.18.

In the town, the population was spread out, with 32.9% under the age of 18, 5.3% from 18 to 24, 31.0% from 25 to 44, 24.4% from 45 to 64, and 6.4% who were 65 years of age or older. The median age was 36 years. For every 100 females, there were 98.4 males. For every 100 females age 18 and over, there were 94.3 males.

The median income for a household in the town was $42,500, and the median income for a family was $45,952. Males had a median income of $33,365 versus $24,135 for females. The per capita income for the town was $18,146. About 8.4% of families and 10.9% of the population were below the poverty line, including 13.1% of those under age 18 and 11.8% of those age 65 or over.

Government 
Edgewood is governed by a commission-manager system.  Prior to January 1, 2022, Edgewood used a strong mayor system of government, but in August 2020 the towns residents voted overwhelmingly to change their form of local government.  The five commissioners select one of their members to fulfill the pro forma duties of town government that require a mayor or presiding officer.  Currently the mayor's role is filled by Commissioner Audrey Jaramillo.

Education
Moriarty-Edgewood School District serves all portions of Edgewood in Santa Fe County. The portion in Bernalillo County is zoned to Albuquerque Public Schools. The portion in Sandoval County is in Bernalillo Public Schools.

Notable people 
 Jason Anderson - 2018 AMA Monster Energy Supercross Champion
 Donald Cerrone (b. 1983) - American professional mixed martial artist
 John Dodson - MMA fighter (grew up in Albuquerque and then Edgewood)

References

External links

 Town of Edgewood official website
 Estancia Valley Economic Development Association
 Edgewood Community Library
 The Independent

Towns in Santa Fe County, New Mexico
Towns in New Mexico